Ezell Brown, (born May 22, 1970) is an American businessman, entrepreneur, investor, philanthropist and chairman of Education Online Services Corporation.

He has over 20 years' experience in the analysis, development, and deployment of full service marketing campaigns.  Brown has pursued a number of philanthropic endeavors and has donated money to various charitable organizations, educational causes and community outreach programs through the Ezell Brown Foundation, established in 2008.

Career 
After college, Brown served as general manager for National Marketing Specialist, a division of Pioneer Financial Services (NASDAQ FMR).  This experience led him to launch other well known companies in the Dallas/Fort Worth area, employing more than one hundred employees through B&B Communications.  Brown continued on the path to become a successful business owner, entrepreneur, investor, and philanthropist.

Brown is Chairman of Education Online Service Corp. (EOServe Corp), an organization dedicated to helping colleges and universities maximize online higher education. His strong desire to help the underserved market of historically black colleges and universities (HBCUs) extend their geographical reach with online marketing technology was the initial inspiration for creating Education Online Services Corporation as well as the fact that online degree programs are now being considered as "strategically important" by HBCUs.

In early 2009, Brown hired long-time civil rights leader Dr. Benjamin F. Chavis, Jr. as President of EOServe Corp. Together they announced a historic partnership with Morris Brown College in April 2009 to lead the resurgence of that institution by enhancing its academic offering and aggressively recruiting and enrolling more students. By August of that same year Education Online Services launched a full, Internet-based degree program in Organizational Leadership and Management for Morris Brown College.

After the success of Morris Brown College, other schools quickly followed suit and partnered with Education Online Services Corporation such as Langston University, Jackson State University, Virginia University of Lynchburg and Tougaloo College. In August 2011, EOServe Corp. and the College of Business at Jackson State University launched the Master of Business Administration online degree program.

In addition, EOServe Corp. partnered with the National Association For Equal Opportunity in Higher Education (NAFEO). This partnership provides NAFEO's 123 member institutions with a cost-effective way of expanding their reach beyond their campuses, to offer their current curriculum to thousands of students who want a degree but for whom a campus-based experience is not optimal.

Other memberships 
Brown serves as Chairman of the Advancement through Education Program, (formerly known as the Under21Foundation), an organization committed to decreasing generational poverty through education by providing financial assistance to mothers between the ages of 21–64 who lack high school diplomas.

He is also an honorary member of the U.S. board of directors for Upliftment Jamaica, an organization committed to empowering impoverished communities throughout Jamaica and the Caribbean.

Personal life 
Brown met his future wife and business partner, Roshunda Young Brown (born September 23, 1969) of Sulphur Springs, Texas, on the campus of the University of Texas during the summer of 1989.  They dated for one and half years and married on December 1, 1990 in Dallas, Texas.  They have two daughters, Kailee and Kiersten, and they currently reside in Parkland, Florida.

Philanthropy 
In the summer of 2008, Ezell and Roshunda Brown founded the Ezell Brown Foundation, a privately owned, non-profit corporation whose mission and purpose is to provide educational opportunity scholarships for underprivileged persons who wish to obtain a high school diploma. The Foundation works closely with numerous corporate sponsors to achieve its fundraising and educational goals.

An independent review board oversees the scholarship program and determines the eligibility of applicants. The review board may also grant access to Higher Education Partner Programs on a test basis to qualified efforts and applicants.  The Board votes on a simple majority basis within approximately one month after applications are collected.

Recognition 
In 2009 Ezell Brown was honored with The Steward Wiley/Wesley John Gaines President's Leadership Award from Morris Brown College.  This award honors persons who have provided exemplary leadership and demonstrated innovative ways to improve their organizations, community, or environment.  They have given generously and unselfishly to the development of others to become leaders and have inspired others to reach their full potential in pursuit of a common vision.

References

American technology chief executives
Living people
1970 births
Morris Brown College alumni
Businesspeople from San Antonio